John Komnenos Choumnos (before 1290 – before 1339) was a Byzantine general, scholar and statesman.

He was the eldest son of the scholar and statesman Nikephoros Choumnos. The date of his birth is unknown, however in ca. 1290–1294, when he is known to have fallen ill, he was still very young. Through the influence of his father, he quickly rose in the imperial hierarchy and was named parakoimomenos tou koitonos. He also led Byzantine forces against the Ottoman Turks in Bithynia in 1300–1306, under Michael IX Palaiologos. His campaigns apparently met with some success, since he acquired a reputation for ability in warfare. In 1307 he was promoted one rank to parakoimomenos tes sphendones. In 1308/1309 he married an unknown lady related to the ruling Palaiologos dynasty, with whom he had a son and a daughter. Their names are unknown. His stance in the Byzantine civil war of 1321–1328 is unknown, but his brother George Choumnos appears to have been a partisan of Andronikos II Palaiologos. Like his father, John was a learned man, having studied rhetoric, philosophy and medicine. A collection of his letters survives, as well as a medical treatise on the proper diet for gout. He died sometime between 1332 and 1338, while serving as governor of Chios.

References

Sources
 
 
 

13th-century births
1330s deaths
14th-century Byzantine people
Byzantine generals
14th-century Byzantine writers
John
Byzantine people of the Byzantine–Ottoman wars
Parakoimomenoi
Byzantine letter writers
Medieval Chios